Lanling County formerly Cangshan County is a county of southern Shandong province, bordering Jiangsu province to the south. It is under the administration of Linyi City.

Administrative divisions
As 2017, this County is divided to 1 subdistrict, 15 towns and 1 township.
Subdistricts
Bianzhuang Subdistrict

Towns

Townships
Xiacun Township

Climate

References 

Counties of Shandong
Linyi